Jennifer Isacco (born 27 February 1977) is an Italian bobsledder who has competed since 1999. At the 2006 Winter Olympics in Turin, she won a bronze medal in the two-woman event with teammate Gerda Weissensteiner.

References
 
 Bobsleigh two-woman Olympic medalists since 2002

1977 births
Bobsledders at the 2006 Winter Olympics
Italian female bobsledders
Living people
Olympic bobsledders of Italy
Olympic bronze medalists for Italy
Olympic medalists in bobsleigh
Medalists at the 2006 Winter Olympics
Sportspeople from Como